Habib Dembélé (born 19 April 1962) is a Malian actor, director, and author, and a candidate for the Malian Presidential elections of 2002 and 2018.

Early life and education
Dembélé attended to Malian Institut National des Arts de Bamako (INA) after a school diploma : Etudes Fondamentales (DEF).

Career
Dembélé is an actor, director, and author.

He performs on both stage and screen. He founded the Gouakoulou Company, the Guimba National Company and the Mandenka International Theatre. He received Mali's Best Actor Award in 1984. His theatre credits include The Strange Destiny of Wangrin, Hyène à jeun and Waari. His film credits include Guimba, le tyran and Finzan (by Cheick Oumar Sissoko), Filon d'or (by Sidi Diabaté) and Macadam Tribu (by Zeca Laplaine). He was also the assistant director on Cheick Oumar's 1997 film La genèse.

Dembélé co-adapted and performed in Sophocles' Antigone and his writing credits include plays such as A vous la nuit, and a novel Sacré Kaba. Dembélé has worked with renowned theatre director Peter Brook in several plays, among them Tragédie d'Hamlet, Tierno Bokar, and Sizwe Banzi is Dead.

Politics
Dembélé was a candidate for the Malian Presidential elections of 2002 and 2018.

Theatre career 
 1983 : Les Tondjons by Samba Niaré
 1986 : L'Étrange Destin de Wangrin by Amadou Hampâté Bâ
 1987 : La Hyène à jeun by Massa Makan Diabaté
 1988 : Wari (in Bambara language) by Ousmane Sow 
 1989 : Férékégna Kamibougou (in Bambara language) by Ousmane Sow
 1995 : Macadam Tribu by Zeka Laplaine
 1995 : Louanse by Ousmane Sow
 1997 : A Vous la Nuit by and with Habib dembélé 
 1998 : Antigone, an adaptation by Habib Dembélé and Jean-Louis Sagot-Duvauroux of Sophocles's Greek tragedy, directed by Sotigui Kouyaté
 2002 : Hamlet by Shakespeare, directed by Peter Brook. Role : Polonius. (International Tour)
 2002 : The Papalagi, from Erich Scheurmann's novel, directed by Hassane Kassi Kouyaté (International Tour)
 2003 : The Bridge, by Laurent Van Wetter, directed by Sotigui Kouyaté (Switzerland & France tour)
 2004 : Tierno Bokar, from Amadou Hampaté Bâ's A Spirit of Tolerance: The Inspiring Life of Tierno Bokar, directed by Peter Brook (International Tour)
 2006 : Sizwe Banzi Is Dead by Athol Fugard, directed by Peter Brook (Théâtre des Bouffes du Nord (Paris) and international tour).
 2009 : Kanouté ka visa ko (in Bambara language), by and with Habib Dembélé (first solo-performer in Mali)
 2011 : Bab et Sane by René Zahnd, directed by Jean-Yves Ruf (International Tour)
 2011 : The Island by Athol Fugard, directed by Hassane Kassi Kouyaté (International Tour)
 2014 : Eye of the wolf, inspired by Daniel Pennac's novel, directed by de Clara Bauer (France and Italy)
 2015 : De la parole à l’écrit, tour of Mali patronned by the l'OIF Organisation Internationale de la Francophonie
 2015 : A vous la Nuit, in Montréal (Canada) and Paris (France)
 2015 : Journées Théâtres Guimba national, in Bamako (Mali)
 2015 : The Island and The Papalagi, revival for Martinique tour and for the Festival sur le Niger, in Segou (Mali)
 2016 : Sounjata by Alexis Martin, in Montréal (Canada)   
 2016 : Kanuté Visa Ko, in Ségou (Mali)
 2016 : "La Comédie au service de la réconciliation, Journées Théâtrales Guimba national in Bamako (Mali)    
 2016 : Sabounyouman (Bamako, Mali)   
 2016 : Dioro Fali (Bamako, Mali)   
 2016 : 52, la bonne à tout faire (Bamako, Mali)   
 2016 : Sounjata by Alexis Martin, world-creation in Marrakech (co-production Canada/Mali/Morocco)  
 2016 : A vous la nuit, tour in Switzerland and for the Festival sur le Niger, in Segou (Mali).

Filmography 
 1989 : Finzan by Cheick Oumar Sissoko
 1995 : Macadam Tribu by Zeca Laplaine
 1995 : Guimba the Tyrant, by Cheick Oumar Sissoko
 1999 : Genesis by Cheick Oumar Sissoko
 2001 : Demain et tous les jours après, by Bernard Stora (TV Film - Arte)
 2002 : Sia, le rêve du python by Dani Kouyaté
 2004 : Moolaadé by Ousmane Sembène
 2005 : Les aventures de Séko Bouaré (TV Series, ORTM)
 2006 : Bamako by Abderrahmane Sissako
 2007 : Faro, Goddess of the Waters by Salif Traoré
 2009 : Quand la ville mord by Dominique Cabrera
 2013 : Laurent et Safi by Anton Vassil
 2014 : Tugël, au bout du petit matin... by Ousmane Barry
 2016 : Wùlu by Daouda Coulibaly
 2016 : Feu de mon corps by Stéphanie Lagarde
 2016 : Wallay by Berni Goldblat

References

External links
 "Bab and Sane" - Grand Lyon
 

20th-century Malian male actors
Living people
Malian male film actors
Malian male stage actors
1962 births
21st-century Malian male actors